Patrick O'Reilly may refer to:

Patrick O'Reilly (Independent politician) (1893–1972), Irish independent politician represented Cavan, 1948–51
Patrick O'Reilly (Longford politician) (1911–2003), Irish Fianna Fáil politician, member of the Senate, 1944–69
Patrick O'Reilly (Cavan politician) (1927–1994), Irish Clann na Talmhan/Fine Gael politician represented Cavan, 1943–73
Patrick O'Reilly (priest) (1843–1914), Catholic priest and educationalist
Patrick J. O'Reilly (actor) (born 1980), Irish actor, director and writer
Patrick J. O'Reilly (politician) (died 1965), Irish politician, member of the 5th Senate
Patrick F. O'Reilly, Irish politician, member of the 7th Senate
Patrick Thomas O'Reilly (1833–1892), Roman Catholic bishop of Springfield, Massachusetts
Paddy O'Reilly (footballer) (1898–?), soccer player
 Patrick W. O'Reilly (1925–2020), American lawyer and politician